Lewis Wigle (March 10, 1845 – July 30, 1934) was an Ontario farmer, businessman and political figure. He represented Essex South in the Legislative Assembly of Ontario from 1875 to 1882 and in the House of Commons of Canada from 1882 to 1887 as a Conservative member.

He was born in Gosfield Township, Essex County, Canada West in 1845, the son of Solomon Wigle. He owned a general store at Leamington and served as reeve of Mersea from 1867 to 1875. Wigle married Rebecca Hairaine in 1868. He was president of the Leamington and St. Clair Railway and a tobacco buyer for the Empire Tobacco Company. After the death of his first wife in 1898, Wigle married Bertha Smith, the widow of a Doctor Wray. After 1887, he ran unsuccessfully four times for the Essex South seat in the House of Commons and in the 1919 provincial election as an independent Conservative. Wigle served as mayor of Leamington from 1902 to 1904.

His daughter Edith married Seger McKay, mayor of Kingsville.

External links
 
 
The Canadian parliamentary companion and annual register, 1877, CH Mackintosh
A Cyclopæedia of Canadian biography : being chiefly men of the time  GM Rose (1886)
Commemorative biographical record of the county of Essex, Ontario ... (1905)

1845 births
1934 deaths
Canadian Methodists
Conservative Party of Canada (1867–1942) MPs
Mayors of places in Ontario
Members of the House of Commons of Canada from Ontario
People from Leamington, Ontario
Progressive Conservative Party of Ontario MPPs